CD36 antigen is a transmembrane, highly glycosylated, glycoprotein expressed by monocytes, macrophages, platelets, microvascular endothelial cells and adipose tissues.  CD36 recognises oxidized low density lipoprotein, long chain fatty acids, anionic phospholipids, collagen types I, IV and V, thrombospondin and Plasmodium falciparum infected erythrocytes.

CD molecules are leucocyte antigens on cell surfaces. CD antigens nomenclature is updated at Protein Reviews On The Web (https://web.archive.org/web/20080920090434/http://mpr.nci.nih.gov/prow/).

Subfamilies
Adhesion molecule CD36 
Lysosome membrane protein II

Human proteins containing this domain 
CD36;      SCARB1;    SCARB2;

References 

Protein domains
Protein families
Membrane proteins